The Oregon Sustainability Center was a proposed high-rise office building that would have been located near Portland State University in Downtown Portland, Oregon. The building was meant to be a "living building" that showcased green building designs and sustainability. The entire project was expected to cost $120 million.  Portland mayor Sam Adams decided to end the planning on the project in October 2012.

See also 

 Architecture of Portland, Oregon
 Edith Green – Wendell Wyatt Federal Building
 List of tallest buildings in Portland, Oregon

References

External links 
 http://oregonsustainabilitycenter.org/default.asp

Buildings and structures in Portland, Oregon
Proposed skyscrapers in the United States